Lorne Cousin is a Los Angeles-based Great Highland bagpipe player, known as the "Scottish Piper to the Stars". Cousin has performed with artists such as Madonna, Missy Elliott, Stella McCartney, and Brian Cox. Lorne Cousin and his group of kilt-wearing bagpipe players were the only male-led group to perform on the main stage at the 2007 Los Angeles Women's Music Festival.

Further reading
 Pipe-trekking among the stars: Lorne Cousin. Piping Today 33 (2008)

References

Living people
Year of birth missing (living people)
Musicians from Los Angeles
Great Highland bagpipe players